The Naughty List is a 2016  Black comedy short film written and directed by Paul Campion, about two American mobsters who come face to face with Santa Claus on Christmas Eve, and discover what it really takes to get on his Naughty or Nice list.

The film is based on the short story  The Siqquism Who Stole Christmas, by author Brian Keene.  It was produced by Michelle Cullen and Paul Campion, and was shot in Camberwell Film Studios, England.

Cast
 Vincenzo Nicoli as Tony Genova
 Sebastian Knapp as Vince Napoli
 Mac Elsey as  Santa Claus

Festival Screenings
One-Reeler Short Film Competition - Online, USA, January 2017
FILMSshort Competition - Finalist  - Online, UK, February 2017
Midwest WeirdFest - Eau Claire, Wisconsin, USA, March 2017 
Bonebat Comedy of Horrors Film Fest - Seattle, Washington, USA, April 2017 
Austin Comedy Short Film Festival - Austin, Texas, USA, April 2017
Comicpalooza Film Festival - Houston, Texas, USA, May 2017
CyberiaVR - San Francisco, California, USA, May 2017
Fantasia Film Festival - Montreal, Canada, July 2017
GenreBlast Film Festival - Winchester, Virginia, USA, September 2017
Nightmares Film Festival - Columbus, Ohio, USA, October 2017
Another Hole in the Head - San Francisco, California, USA, October 2017
FKM, Fantastic Film Festival - La Coruña, Spain, October 2017
Dead Witch Film Festival - Newnan, Georgia, USA, November 2017
Freedom Shorts - Philadelphia, Pennsylvania, USA, November 2017
Buried Alive Film Fest - Atlanta, Georgia, USA, November 2017
Lancaster International Short Film Festival - Lancaster, Pennsylvania, USA, November 2017
Fantastic Planet Film Festival - Sydney, Australia, December 2017
Stark County International Short Film Series - Canton, Ohio, USA, December 2017
Yubari Fantastic Film Festival - Yubari, Hokkaido, March 2018
Weihnachts Film Festival - Berlin, Germany, December 2018
iShorts - Czech Republic and Slovakia, December 2018
BizarroCon - Portland, Oregon, USA, January 2019
Phoenix Comedy Short Film Festival - Phoenix, Arizona, USA, April 2019

Awards
One-Reeler Short Film Competition - Award of Excellence
Best Ensemble Cast - The Austin Comedy Short Film Festival, 2017

Nominations
Best Original Music - The Austin Comedy Short Film Festival, 2017
Best Comedy Short Film - The Austin Comedy Short Film Festival, 2017
Best Screenplay - Short Film - GenreBlast Film Festival, 2017
Funniest Short Film - GenreBlast Film Festival, 2017
Best Overall Short Film - GenreBlast Film Festival, 2017
Best Horror Comedy Short - Nightmares Film Festival, 2017

References

External links

2016 horror films
2016 films
British comedy horror films
British independent films
2010s comedy horror films
2016 independent films
2016 comedy films
2010s English-language films
2010s British films